Starolaspa (Urum: Эст’и Ласпи) is a village in Boykivske Raion (district) in Donetsk Oblast of eastern Ukraine, at 67.7 km SSE from the centre of Donetsk city, on the right bank of the Kalmius river.

During the War in Donbass, that started in 2014, the village was taken under control of pro-Russian forces.

Demographics

Native language as of the Ukrainian Census of 2001:
Ukrainian 9.31%
Russian 89.29%
Greek 0.58%
Gagauz 0.23%
Armenian 0.12%

References

External links
 Weather forecast for Starolaspa

Villages in Kalmiuske Raion